Baron Morris of Kenwood, of Kenwood in the City of Sheffield, is a title in the Peerage of the United Kingdom. It was created in 1950 for the Labour politician Harry Morris. He had previously represented Sheffield Central and Sheffield Neepsend in the House of Commons.  the title is held by his grandson, the third Baron, who succeeded his father in 2004.

Barons Morris of Kenwood (1950)
Harry Morris, 1st Baron Morris of Kenwood (1893–1954)
Philip Geoffrey Morris, 2nd Baron Morris of Kenwood (1928–2004)
Jonathan David Morris, 3rd Baron Morris of Kenwood (b. 1968)

The heir apparent is the present holder's son the Hon. Benjamin Julian Morris (b. 1998)

Notes

References
Kidd, Charles, Williamson, David (editors). Debrett's Peerage and Baronetage (1990 edition). New York: St Martin's Press, 1990, 

Baronies in the Peerage of the United Kingdom
Noble titles created in 1950